General Lambert may refer to:

Henri François Lambert (1760–1796), French Revolutionary Army brigadier general
John Lambert (British Army officer) (1772–1847), British Army general
John Lambert (general) (1619–1684), British Army major general
Karl Lambert (1815–1865), Imperial Russian Army General of Cavalry
Peter J. Lambert (fl. 1980s–2020s), U.S. Air Force major general
Thomas Stanton Lambert (1870/71–1921), British Army major general (temporary rank)
Wayne W. Lambert (born 1936), U.S. Air Force brigadier general